Eremophila micrantha, commonly known as small-flowered poverty bush, is a flowering plant in the figwort family, Scrophulariaceae and is endemic to Western Australia. It is a rounded shrub with many thin, flexible branches, narrow leaves and small white flowers.

Description
The branches are glabrous, yellowish when young and become red-brown as they age. They are also yellow-green in colour, covered with small raised lumps and are sticky due to the presence of resin.

In bud, the flowers are pinkish but open to white, spotted red on the lower middle petal lobe and spotted yellow inside the tube. The outside surface of the tube is densely hairy while the inside is glabrous. The 4 stamens are fully enclosed in the petal tube.

Taxonomy and naming 
The species was first formally described by Robert Chinnock in 2007 and the description was published in Eremophila and Allied Genera: A Monograph of the Plant Family Myoporaceae. The specific epithet (micrantha) is derived from the Ancient Greek μικρός (mikrós) meaning "small" or "little", and ἄνθος (ánthos) meaning "flower", in reference to the small flowers of this species.

Distribution and habitat
Eremophila micrantha occurs between Meekatharra and Newman in the Gascoyne and Murchison biogeographic regions. It grows in shallow stony soil and near the margins of salt pans, often in mulga shrubland.

Conservation status
This species is classified as "not threatened" by the Western Australian Government Department of Parks and Wildlife.

Use in horticulture
Older specimens of this eremophila have very dark trunks, complementing the dark green foliage and tiny white flowers. The small, persistent, white hairy fruits are an added attraction. It can be propagated from seed or with difficulty, by grafting and grows best in a sunny location in well-drained soil. It only needs an occasional watering in long summer droughts and is very tolerant of frosts.

References

Eudicots of Western Australia
micrantha
Endemic flora of Western Australia
Plants described in 2007
Taxa named by Robert Chinnock